The 1997 Rutgers Scarlet Knights football team represented Rutgers University in the 1997 NCAA Division I-A football season. In their second season under head coach Terry Shea, the Scarlet Knights compiled a 0–11 record, were outscored by opponents 496 to 191, and finished in last place in the Big East Conference. The team's statistical leaders included Mike McMahon with 1,259 passing yards, Jacki Crooks with 758 rushing yards, and Walter King with 445 receiving yards.

Schedule

References

Rutgers
Rutgers Scarlet Knights football seasons
College football winless seasons
Rutgers Scarlet Knights football